The House at 507 Jackson Drive is a historic home in Sarasota, Florida, United States. It is located at 507 Jackson Drive. On February 5, 1998, it was added to the U.S. National Register of Historic Places. Built in 1926, it is a private residence of the Mediterranean Revival architecture style.

References

External links
 Sarasota County listings at National Register of Historic Places

Houses on the National Register of Historic Places in Sarasota County, Florida
Houses in Sarasota, Florida
Mediterranean Revival architecture in Florida
Houses completed in 1926